Nadia Lun was a former Miss Hong Kong 2008 contestant. She was born on 24 November 1986. She won the Miss Internet Popularity Award and was formerly a TVB actress. She appeared in the Hong Kong gameshow All Star Glam Exam in 2011, along with Suyen Cheung, Candy Chang, and Nicole Wan as a Star Lady.

Filmography
 Twilight Investigation (2010)
 To Be or Not to Be (2014)

References

External links
Nadia Lun's Blog

TVB actors
Hong Kong people
1986 births
Living people